Parliamentary elections were held in the Federated States of Micronesia on 3 March 2015. A simultaneous independence referendum was also scheduled to be held in Chuuk State, but was postponed shortly before the elections.

Electoral system
The 14 members of Congress were elected in two methods; 10 are elected from single-member constituencies by plurality voting, whilst four senators are elected by the four States. Following the elections, the President and Vice-President are elected by Congress from the Senators.

Campaign
A total of 34 candidates registered to contest the 14 seats. In late February the election of the House of Representatives for Chuuk was postponed by State Governor Johnson Elimo, with the Public Affairs Office stating that voting documents were not ready. Elimo also postponed the planned independence referendum.

References

2015
2015 in the Federated States of Micronesia
2015 elections in Oceania